The San Ysidro Mountains are a mountain range in southern San Diego County, California and Baja California, Mexico. The mountains are a rugged coastal foothill range of the Peninsular Ranges system. Major peaks include the highest summit of the range, Otay Mountain, and the Cerro San Isidro which forms the southern extrusion of the range on the Mexican side of the border. The majority of the range is within the Otay Mountain Wilderness Area, in the United States.

Geography 

On the western side of the mountain lies Lower Otay Lake and Otay Mesa, with the Richard J. Donovan Correctional Facility and other detention centers and law enforcement properties lying on the southwest slope of the mountain. On the eastern flank, Mine Canyon and Marron Valley separate the San Ysidro Mountains from Tecate Peak (Kuuchamaa).

Cerro San Isidro 
The Cerro San Isidro, located in Tijuana, is separated from the rest of the range by the border fence and the Rio Alamar, and forms the southern portion of the mountains. A colonia of Tijuana, Valle Imperial, stretches across the western slope of the mountain.

Ecology
The native vegetation of the San Ysidro Mountains represents the coastal sage scrub of the California coastal sage and chaparral ecoregion (western faces); and plants of the California montane chaparral and woodlands ecoregion (inland). The San Ysidro Mountains are one of the few locations the rare Tecate Cypress (Cupressus forbesii) is found. This tree was once abundant in the higher elevations of the range as well as in its canyons. The San Ysidro Mountains were deforested of living foliage by wildfires in 2003 and 2007. Cupressus forbesii is a fire ecology dependent species, and there has been some evidence of regrowth starting.

See also
California chaparral and woodlands — Terrestrial Biome
Chaparral

References 

 
Peninsular Ranges
Mountain ranges of San Diego County, California
Mountain ranges of Baja California
Mountain Empire (San Diego County)
Mountain ranges of Southern California